Le Médecin malgré lui ("The doctor/physician in spite of himself") is a farce by Molière first presented in 1666 (published as a manuscript in early 1667) at le théâtre du Palais-Royal by la Troupe du Roi.  The play is one of several plays by Molière to center on Sganarelle, a character that Molière himself portrayed, and is a comedic satire of 17th century French medicine. The music composed by Marc-Antoine Charpentier is lost.

Characters
Sganarelle, an alcoholic, gluttonous woodcutter (The title character)
Martine, Sganarelle's wife
Lucinde, Sganarelle's patient; daughter of Geronte
Léandre, Lucinde's lover
Geronte, a wealthy bourgeois; father of Lucinde
Valère, Geronte's educated servant
Lucas, Geronte's non-educated servant
Jacqueline, Lucas's wife and Geronte's non-educated feeder
Monsieur Robert, Sganarelle's neighbor
Thibaut, a country person
Perrin, a country person; son of Thibaut

Synopsis
Sganarelle, a poor woodcutter, makes life a living hell for his wife and family by spending what little he earns on food and drink. As the play opens, he is seen arguing with and eventually beating his wife, Martine, who then decides to take revenge. As she is plotting, she hears two passing servants of a rich man mention their frustration at being unable to find a doctor who can cure their master's daughter's mysterious illness. She convinces the two that her husband is an eccentric but brilliant doctor, whom they must beat into admitting his identity. The servants find Sganarelle cutting wood and drinking in the woods nearby and beat him until he finally admits to being a doctor.

The servants take him to meet their master, Geronte, and his daughter Lucinde who has become mysteriously mute. Sganarelle spends his first session with her frantically trying to pass as a real doctor, mainly out of fear of being beaten again. When he sees how much Geronte is willing to pay him, however, he decides to give up woodcutting and remain a "doctor" for the rest of his life.

Eventually Sganarelle discovers that his patient is in fact only pretending to be ill, because she is betrothed to a rich man whom she does not love. Farcical comedy ensues, climaxing with Sganarelle being discovered and almost executed. The play ends with a classical moment of deus ex machina; with Lucinde's love, Geronte's wishes, and Sganarelle's fate being neatly and happily resolved.

Sganarelle's monologue
Much of the play consists of Sganarelle's boastful comic monologues. Below is a translation of Sganarelle's most famous speech, which is considered one of the funniest in French theatre:

Adaptations
Molière's play was adapted by Henry Fielding as The Mock Doctor, and Charles Gounod wrote an opera based on the play, also entitled Le médecin malgré lui.

An hour-long radio adaptation of the play by Ernest Kinoy was performed on the NBC Theatre on June 25, 1950. Another hour-long radio adaptation was broadcast on the Lux Summer Theatre on July 13, 1953.

Films
 Le Médecin malgré lui, directed by Émile Chautard, 1910
 Medico per forza, directed by Carlo Campogalliani, with Ettore Petrolini, 1931
 The Doctor in Spite of Himself, Hong Kong film starring Cheung Tat-ming, 1999
Le Médecin malgré lui (Toubib al affia), Moroccan film by Henry Jacques

Poetry
 Le Médecin malgré lui, by William Carlos Williams

References

External links

Free Online 2011 American Translation
 

Plays by Molière
1666 plays
Plays adapted into operas
Plays adapted into radio programs
French plays adapted into films
Medicine and health in fiction